Hotel Miramar may refer to:

Hotel Miramar is the former name of The Mira Hong Kong
Hotel Miramar (Bissau)
Hotel Miramar (Jersey)
Hotel Miramar (São Tomé)
Hotel Miramar Singapore